Callopistromyia strigula is a species of picture-winged fly in the family Ulidiidae.

Distribution
Canada, United States.

References

Otitinae
Insects described in 1873
Taxa named by Hermann Loew
Diptera of North America